The 2016/17 FIS Nordic Combined World Cup was the 34th World Cup season, organized by the International Ski Federation. It started on 26 November 2016 in Ruka, Finland and ended on 19 March 2017 in Schonach, Germany.

Calendar

Men

Men's team

Standings

Overall 

Final standings after 23 events.

Nations Cup 

Final standings after 25 events.

Prize money 

Final standings after 25 events.

Achievements

First World Cup podium
 , 19, in his 2nd season – no. 3 in the WC 6 in Ramsau
 , 20, in his 2nd season – no. 2 in the WC 7 in Lahti
 , 24, in his 6th season – no. 3 in the WC 13 in Seefeld
 , 24, in his 5th season – no. 2 in the WC 16 in PyeongChang

Victories in this World Cup (in brackets victory for all time)
 , 10 (41) first places
 , 8 (14) first places
 , 2 (9) first places
 , 2 (5) first places
 , 1 (17) first place

Retirements 

Following are notable Nordic combined skiers who announced their retirement:

References

2016 in Nordic combined
2017 in Nordic combined
FIS Nordic Combined World Cup
Nordic Combined